Kuşçular is a village in Tarsus district of Mersin Province, Turkey. It is situated in the Toros Mountains. The population of village was 154  as of 2012.

References

Villages in Tarsus District